Luque is a municipality in the province of Córdoba, Spain.

Municipalities in the Province of Córdoba (Spain)